Khvicha Kvaratskhelia (born 12 February 2001, in short Kvara) is a Georgian professional footballer who plays as a winger for Serie A  club  Napoli  and the Georgia national team. Known for his flair, dribbling and playmaking, he is considered to be one of the best young players in the world.

Club career

Early career
Coming through the youth system, Kvaratskhelia began his senior career at Dinamo Tbilisi in 2017, making his senior debut against Kolkheti-1913 Poti, coming on as a 62nd minute substitute in a 1–1 draw on 29 September 2017. In total, Kvaratskhelia made five appearances in all competitions for Dinamo Tbilisi, scoring his first goal in a 1–0 win away to Shukura Kobuleti on 18 November 2017.

Due to his performances for Georgia's under-17 team, Kvaratskhelia became the first winner of the newly introduced Aleksandre Chivadze golden medal in 2017, awarded annually by Georgian Football Federation to talented young players. The following year he received a silver medal for his displays for Georgia's under-19's.

In March 2018, Kvaratskhelia left Dinamo Tbilisi as a result of a contract dispute and subsequently signed for Rustavi on a free transfer. In April 2018, Kvaratskhelia was the subject of interest from German champions Bayern Munich and was in attendance for Bayern's 0–0 draw against Sevilla in the UEFA Champions League quarter-final. During the 2018 Erovnuli Liga season, Kvaratskhelia scored three goals across 18 appearances for Rustavi.

In 2018, The Guardian named Kvaratskhelia among 60 best young players worldwide.

On 15 February 2019, Kvaratskhelia joined Russian Premier League (RPL) club Lokomotiv Moscow on loan. He made his league debut on 10 March as an 86th-minute substitute for Jefferson Farfán against Anzhi Makhachkala. On 1 July, Lokomotiv announced that Kvaratskhelia had left the club after his loan expired. Following the loss of Kvaratskhelia, Lokomotiv Moscow manager Yuri Semin said he was very disappointed after failing to agree on a permanent transfer with Kvaratskhelia as Semin considered him extremely talented.

Rubin Kazan
On 6 July 2019, Kvaratskhelia signed a five-year deal with Rubin Kazan. He played his first game on 15 July against his previous club Lokomotiv, coming on as a substitute in the second half and scoring the equalizer in a 1–1 draw. Kvaratskhelia was named as best player of the match by Rubin fans on the official site of the club.

Overall, his purchase was hailed by several Russian media outlets as the main transfer success for Rubin, who saw the player's market value increased five times in a single season between June 2019 and June 2020. Based on the votes among Rubin supporters, Kvaratskhelia won Player of the Month nomination four times in 2020–21, namely in August, September, October and April.

In early 2021, L'Equipe published a list of 50 best players born in the 21st century, with Kvaratskhelia being the only RPL player to be included.

Dinamo Batumi
On 7 March 2022, FIFA announced that, due to the Russian invasion of Ukraine, foreign players in Russia can unilaterally suspend their contracts until 30 June, and were allowed to sign with clubs outside of Russia until the same date. On 24 March 2022, Rubin Kazan announced that Kvaratskhelia's contract has been suspended. On the same day, he joined Dinamo Batumi of Georgia.

Kvaratskhelia took part in 11 league matches with Dinamo Batumi, scoring eight times and providing two assists. Erovnuli Liga named him the best player of the second round of the season, which coincided with the period between April and July.

Napoli
On 1 July 2022, Serie A side Napoli confirmed the signing of Kvaratskhelia on a deal lasting until 2027 from Dinamo Batumi for a reported fee of €10–12 million. Kvaratskhelia's debut for the club came on 15 August, in the first matchday of Serie A against Hellas Verona; he scored and assisted in a 5–2 victory. He scored twice in the following matchday against Monza on 21 August, netting his first Serie A brace in a 4–0 win. Following these games, Kvaratskhelia topped the Serie A top scorers' list, becoming the first player in Napoli's history to score three goals in the two opening league matches. Furthermore, he was named Serie A Player of the Month in August 2022.  

On 4 October, he scored his first Champions League goal in a 6–1 away win over Ajax. With another goal and an assist in the return leg a week later, Kvaratskhelia was named Man of the Match, and included in the Champions League team of the week. With three goals and an assist during the month of February 2023, Kvaratskhelia was named Serie A Player of the Month for a second time, becoming the first player to win the award multiple times in the same season.

International career
Kvaratskhelia made his debut for the Georgia national team on 7 June 2019, as a starter in a Euro 2020 qualifier against Gibraltar. On 14 October 2020, he scored his first senior international goal in a 1–1 UEFA Nations League draw with North Macedonia. On 28 March 2021, Kvaratskhelia scored against Spain, followed by another goal three days later against Greece. On 11 November 2021, Kvaratskhelia's brace helped Georgia win over Sweden.

He scored three times in four games of the first phase of the 2022–23 Nations League, and topped the list of players in two nominations, including in the overall ranking. In the remaining two autumn games Kvaratskhelia added two more goals, which made him the most prolific Georgian player during this tournament. whoscored.com named him in the Best XI both in June and September and awarded him the highest seasonal rating point (8.2) among Group C team players.

Personal life
Khvicha is the son of former  footballer Badri Kvaratskhelia, He has two brothers, and his younger brother Tornike (b. 2010) also plays football. He has been nicknamed "Kvaradona" after the Napoli legend Diego Maradona, with both of them having very similar dribbling styles.

Career statistics

Club

International

Scores and results list Georgia's goal tally first, score column indicates score after each Kvaratskhelia goal.

Honours
Lokomotiv Moscow
Russian Cup: 2018–19

Individual
Russian Premier League Best Young Player: 2019–20, 2020–21
Russian Premier League Best Left Winger: 2020–21
Georgian Footballer of the Year: 2020, 2021, 2022
Serie A Player of the Month: August 2022, February 2023

References

External links
Profile at the S.S.C Napoli website
 Profile at UEFA
 Profile at FC Rubin Kazan 

2001 births
Living people
Footballers from Tbilisi
Footballers from Georgia (country)
Association football midfielders
FC Dinamo Tbilisi players
FC Metalurgi Rustavi players
FC Lokomotiv Moscow players
FC Rubin Kazan players
FC Dinamo Batumi players
S.S.C. Napoli players
Erovnuli Liga players
Russian Premier League players
Serie A players
Georgia (country) youth international footballers
Georgia (country) under-21 international footballers
Georgia (country) international footballers
Expatriate footballers from Georgia (country)
Expatriate footballers in Russia
Expatriate footballers in Italy
Expatriate sportspeople from Georgia (country) in Russia
Expatriate sportspeople from Georgia (country) in Italy